This is a list of some of the more popular or important episodes of The Lone Shark television program.

List Of Notable Episodes

An Evening Of Bonding With Sy Becker (1991 – Recorded)

This first episode of The Lone Shark featured an interview of Sy Becker (the former movie reviewer for WTNH News in New Haven Connecticut). The opening credits were created by host Jim Sharky himself when he was allowed to use the marquee of the Community Theater in Fairfield, Connecticut to spell out the credits. The interview was conducted at a Chinese food restaurant and included pre-taped questions for Becker from WFAC-TV personalities such as Gus Montanaro (host of “Bridgeport's Open Forum”), Rod Michaud (host of “Talking Sports” and “The Rod Michaud Show”), and Gary “Music G” Mazzadra (host of “The Music G Show”). In response to one of the pre-taped questions, Becker predicted (somewhat correctly) that newcomer actresses Virginia Madsen and Jennifer Connelly would eventually become big stars in Hollywood. The episode culminated in a montage of “bonding moments” between Sharky and Becker, set to the song  “Feelings” by Morris Albert.

The Jeffrey Dahmer Children's Show (1991 – Recorded)

Host Jim Sharky and guest co-host Lou Segal appeared as disembodied heads floating inside what was supposed to be serial killer Jeffrey Dahmer's refrigerator (filled with body parts). A viewer named “Maurice Valencia” called the program with tasteless jokes about Dahmer and his victims. Later in the program, Sharky lip-synched to a version of “Mack The Knife” that Sharky himself had pre-recorded. This episode led to the first print media attention for The Lone Shark when Connecticut Post humorist Charles Walsh mentioned the episode in his weekly column. This episode also prompted Sean Haffner to contact Jim Sharky and offer his assistance to the production of The Lone Shark.

The Leonard Nimoy Disco Dance Party (1991 – Recorded)

Jim Sharky had learned that actor Leonard Nimoy had once recorded a collection of songs, so Sharky decided to feature the album by Nimoy on The Lone Shark. The “guest” on this episode was an overweight, moustachioed “Mr. Spock”, who wore an ill-fitting Star Trek shirt and khaki shorts. The episode also featured a pair of professional ballroom dancers from the local Arthur Murray Dance School who danced to various songs from the Nimoy album. During one of the dance segments, Sharky and Mr. Spock could also be seen dancing to the music. The Arthur Miller dancers eventually walked out of the studio in the middle of the program after Rusty Butler and her seeing-eye dog Amber began dancing to one of Nimoy's songs. This episode was Sean Haffner's first appearance on The Lone Shark, although his face was hidden under a rubber alien mask as he sat in the in-studio audience.

Blind Mini-Golf (1991 – Recorded)

This episode featured Jim Sharky and “Rusty” Butler (the blind host of a television program which featured people with various physical disabilities) competing in a round of miniature golf. The episode was inspired when Sharky learned that Butler regularly played golf. This “on-location” episode of The Lone Shark was recorded at Milford Amusement in Milford, Connecticut. Butler, who was accompanied around the course by her seeing-eye dog Amber, eventually won the competition by one stroke. After the competition was over, the Milford Amusement management re-opened their indoor facilities (which had closed for the night) and allowed Sharky, Butler and The Lone Shark crew (Gordon Oppenheimer, Sean Haffner and Lou Segal) to play video games, pinball and skeeball. The management also re-opened the Nathan's Restaurant located within Milford Amusement to allow Sharky and the crew to record the final segment of the episode.

Sharky Sings For His Supper (1991 – Recorded)

This episode featured a segment which was recorded on-location at an Italian restaurant in Stamford, Connecticut, which had a weekly karaoke night. Recording at the restaurant ran into trouble at first, as Producer/cameraman Sean Haffner was confronted by a pair of large Italian gentlemen who demanded “No cameras!”. Sharky eventually persuaded the gentlemen to allow Haffner to record the evening's entertainment. After many of the restaurant's regular patrons performed various songs for the rest of the audience, VoxPop host Bill Arciprete sang The Beach Boys’ song “Good Vibrations”. The final performance of the segment featured host Jim Sharky and singer Annette Wellington (an African-American) singing the Paul McCartney/Stevie Wonder song “Ebony And Ivory”. After the karaoke performances ended, The Lone Shark crew was given a free dinner and then invited into the restaurant owner's office – where the owner then offered them a multitude of narcotic drugs (which Sharky and the crew graciously refused).

Tattoo You (1992 – Recorded)

This episode featured tattooist Danny Williams, a local artist who was considered to be one of the top ten tattoo artists in the United States. Williams worked on an elaborate tattoo on the back of one of his clients while answering questions from Jim Sharky and "Liberace" (Connecticut actor Lance Fritz). The episode featured extremely close-up views of the tattooing as it progressed during the program. Although he was a serious artist, Williams had a good sense of humor about many of the questions Sharky asked him during the episode. However, Williams did not seem to be amused when Sharky mentioned that “Liberace” wanted a tattoo of his penis on his penis – but he wanted the tattoo to be larger than the actual penis.
When Williams died on January 20, 2009 (almost 17 years after his one-time appearance on The Lone Shark), his obituary wrongly listed the name of The Lone Shark as ”The Lone Wolf Show’.

St. Patrick's Day Piercing Show (1992 – Live)

This first live episode of The Lone Shark featured licensed body piercer Rich Wincapaw, who performed two body piercings as host Jim Sharky fielded live phonecalls from viewers. Wincapaw pierced a man's nipple and a woman's navel. As the piercings were performed, they were broadcast full-screen in extreme close-up – which even Sharky, Haffner and the in-studio and at-home audience found to be very disturbing (Haffner, who was at the controls of the camera that was recording the piercings, actually had to turn away from the camera monitor, while still trying to keep the image of the piercings in the camera's field of view).

While taking phone calls, Sharky was confronted by a female caller who began berating him for his recent defamation of a Stratford Star columnist (both on the program and in a recent interview of Sharky and Haffner in the Stratford Star). Sharky's retort to the caller was to say ”Dare I call you a ‘frigid bitch’? No, I won't, because I don't know you". Still, Sharky's comment and the graphic broadcast of the body piercings prompted complaints to the station management, who, after reviewing a recording of the episode, stated ”There's no place on television for that kind of material”, and slapped The Lone Shark's Producers with a two-week suspension. Within a week, after Sharky and Haffner made their case that he had no legal right to penalize Producers for the content of their programs, the Station Manager rescinded the suspension and The Lone Shark continued to be broadcast.

Sharky Rubs You The Wrong Way (1992 – Recorded)

This episode of The Lone Shark featured a pair of masseuses, who discussed their profession with host Jim Sharky while giving massages to both Sharky (on a massage table in the studio) and Director Gordon Oppenheimer. Oppenheimer directed the program while lying face-down on a massage table that had been set up inside the studio's control room. At one point late in the episode, Oppenheimer became so relaxed from his massage that he had what Sharky called “… a Calgon Moment” and almost fell asleep, totally ignoring Sharky's repeated requests to change camera shots. Eventually, Oppenheimer snapped out of his massage-induced haze and continued to direct the rest of the episode.

Calls to the White House (1993 – Recorded)

Because the White House phone number is available to the public and anyone can call there, host Jim Sharky decided to attempt to call President Bill Clinton. On the first attempt, the White House switchboard operator transferred Sharky's call to the White House Press Department. When that call failed to provide results (the Press Department had already closed for the evening), Sean Haffner suggested that Sharky try to call the White House kitchen, because, Haffner reasoned, the kitchen was one section of the White House that would have to be constantly staffed 24 hours. Sharky once again called the White House switchboard and to their surprise, their call was connected to the kitchen. Unfortunately, Sharky quickly annoyed the White House kitchen staff member who had answered the phone, and the kitchen staffer eventually hung up on Sharky. Still, Sharky and Haffner considered their experiment a success.

The Topical Show (1993 – Recorded)

This episode was created to work around a new rule at the Xavier Hall studios which required all Producers to submit recordings of their programs two weeks ahead of the programs’ broadcast dates. To make the episode topical (and therefore irrelevant if it was not broadcast within a few days of its recording), Sharky and Haffner restricted their discussions to subjects from that day's news. Also featured on the episode was the music video for the Red Hot Chili Peppers’ song “Catholic Schoolgirls Rule”. The video included scenes of the band members dressed as priests while attractive women dressed as Catholic schoolgirls acted as if they were performing acts of fellatio on the band members. At the end of the video, one of the “schoolgirls” took off her uniform and danced bare-breasted. This video appeared on The Lone Shark in its entirety, with no censorship whatsoever.

Groundhog Day Show (1994 – Live)

Although this episode of The Lone Shark had no particularly notable segments, the entire episode itself is notable for the fact that it became a finalist in an international video competition.

Sharky and Haffner had learned of the annual “Hometown Video Contest” conducted by the Alliance For Community Media. This contest was open to any Producers of Public-access television programs in the U.S., Canada, Puerto Rico and Guam. The main incentive for Sharky and Haffner to enter episodes of The Lone Shark into the competition was the fact that they could get copies of the comments of the judges who reviewed and voted on the video entries. These judges were professional television Producers, and Sharky and Haffner wanted to see what their professional opinion of The Lone Shark would be. Sharky and The Lone Shark's video graphics creator Dave Warner each submitted entries of episodes that heavily featured the high-quality CGI graphics created by Warner. Haffner decided that he wanted to submit a basic, non-themed episode so that he would get professional feedback on a regular episode of The Lone Shark. He chose the February 2, 1994 (Groundhog Day) episode, which featured Sharky and Haffner discussing a range of subjects, but focusing on the 1994 Winter Olympics – and specifically Tonya Harding's troubles during her Olympic Figure Skating performance. Haffner repeatedly mentioned that he believed that Harding had ”… the biggest ass in figure skating”.

A few weeks after submitting their entries, Haffner received notification that his “Groundhog Day Show” entry had been chosen as a finalist in the competition. When he contacted the Alliance For Community Media for more information, Haffner was told that the episode had been voted to be one of the top-five entries out of a field of over 1600 entries. A few weeks later, Haffner received notification that the episode had not won the competition, along with a certificate for having a finalist entry as well as the judges’ comments. Upon review of the judges’ comments, Haffner discovered that although two of the three judges had enjoyed the episode and scored it highly, the third judge (a woman who was offended by Haffner's comments about Tonya Harding's physical attributes) gave the episode low scores, thus preventing The Lone Shark from winning the competition.

Calls To England (1995 – Live)
[Three Episodes]

With nothing planned for a Monday evening's episode of The Lone Shark, Jim Sharky decided to attempt to call someone (actually, anyone) in Europe. Sharky began dialing random numbers about 30 minutes before the program began broadcasting. The Lone Shark was to go on-air at 9 p.m. EST, but Sharky didn't consider the 5-hour time difference between Connecticut and Europe. The first time someone in Europe answered Sharky's call, it turned out to be a patient in a Belgian hospital (who had been sleeping until the phone began ringing at 1:30 a.m.). Sharky's second successful call was answered by a young man in England. Fortunately for The Lone Shark, this Englishman usually worked the night shift, but had Mondays off from work. Sharky made sure that the Englishman would be ready to answer the phone again when The Lone Shark was broadcasting later that evening and promised to call him back.

Thus began three episodes of The Lone Shark featuring phone calls to an extremely friendly and intelligent man who (he later admitted to Sharky) was not even sure that he was actually talking to someone who was hosting a live television program. Sharky promised to prove to the Englishman that the calls were not a prank by sending copies of episodes of The Lone Shark featuring the phone calls. Sharky was able to gather the young Englishman's mailing information, but instead of giving the information to Haffner for safekeeping (Haffner usually handled all of the paperwork for the program), Sharky took possession of the mailing information and promptly lost it. So the young Englishman who had helped to create three interesting episodes of The Lone Shark never received proof that the phone calls were not pranks. Although Sharky promised to pay WFAC-TV for the cost of the long-distance phone calls, these three episodes prompted the station management to put a block on all outgoing long-distance calls from the studio, which ended any further calls to England.

The Fight of the Century (1995 – Live)

In December 1994, a caller to The Lone Shark told host Jim Sharky ”I wanna see you fight Jerry Jer”. Jerry “Jer” McClelland was the African-American host of ”The Jerry Jer Show” on WFAC-TV. McClelland was known for hosting his program as the character ”Tampon Man”, wearing a feminine pad (with a large red spot on it) on his forehead while ranting against all races and religions. McClelland was most well known for his ”Die List” – a list of ten people upon whom he wished death each week (punctuating each name on the list with shouts of ”DIE! DIE! DIE!”)

For five months, Sharky ignored the growing chorus of viewers who would call the program and agree that they also wanted to see him fight McClelland. Finally at the end of April 1995, in the middle of an episode of The Lone Shark, Sharky announced that he and McClelland would be boxing on the next week's episode. Sharky's announcement came as a surprise to Producer Sean Haffner, whose job it was to plan and organize each of the episodes of The Lone Shark – especially since this episode was obviously going to be one of the most complicated events ever produced at WFAC-TV. Sharky (with usual tongue in cheek) named the upcoming episode ”The Fight of the Century”.

Sharky would have no duties other than to fight McClelland. Haffner had decided that he himself and Alternavision host/Producer Bill Arciprete would host the ”Fight of the Century” episode of The Lone Shark. Arciprete and Haffner sat behind a desk at the edge of the “boxing ring” that they themselves created by marking out a 12’ x 12’ square on the floor with duct tape. As they read each boxer's stats, CGI pages of those same stats appeared on the television screen for home viewers. Singer/musician Dave Schneider of the band “The Zambonis” offered his services as the fight's referee. Also on hand was Lone Shark viewer Sean Dennehy as “Habbeeb The Slurpee Boy” (in place of a water boy), a character that he had created as a regular caller to the program. Security for the event was provided by local professional wrestler “The Bayou Mounty” and his wrestling cohorts “The Slasher” and “The Halfbreed”. Director Gordon Oppenheimer's wife Sheila (a registered nurse) was in-studio to provide any medical attention, if needed. Lone Shark crewmember Rachel Olschan (known as “The Lovely Darla” on the WFAC-TV programs that she appeared on) was the Round Card Girl. Olschan (dressed in a short black cocktail dress) displayed large foam board cards with the fight round numbers on them before each round began (to the cheers and whistles of the in-studio audience).

An unexpected (and unwanted) participant in the event was ”Bridgeport's Open Forum” host Gus Montanaro. Montanaro entered the studio after McClelland and before Sharky (to the obvious shock of Haffner, who had booked all of the guests that he wanted involved in the already logistically strained production). As Jim Sharky stormed into the studio, Sharky began cursing at Montanaro for involving himself in a production of a program on which Montanaro was no longer welcome. Montanaro declared that he would not be leaving the studio, and proceeded to stand in McClelland's corner. Haffner, restricted by the live program's 30-minute time constraint, could only ask Montanaro to sit down in the audience twice before giving up and returning to his hosting duties with Arciprete. After an explanation of the fight's rules by referee Schneider, the fight was ready to begin. Arciprete, noticing Montanaro giving advice to McClelland in his corner of the ring, put out a call for someone in the studio audience to join Sharky in his corner. Answering that call was Matt Winters (a.k.a. “Matt From Orange”), a long-time fan of The Lone Shark and a regular caller to the program. Finally, Arciprete rang the bell and The Fight of the Century began.

Sharky and McClelland had agreed before the fight that they both would not throw full-strength punches, but as soon as the first round began, Sharky was taken aback as McClelland actually did punch as hard as he could. At one point, McClelland had backed Sharky into a corner, and as Sharky turned away from McClelland, began throwing multiple rabbit punches to the back of Sharky's head. Referee Dave Schneider jumped between the boxers and warned McClelland that rabbit punches were not allowed in boxing. Multiple times during the fight, both boxers’ head protection (which the station management required they wear) spun sideways on their heads, leading to temporary halts to the fight to allow for readjustment of the headgear. During the first such halt in the action, a mistake by Haffner with the official fight timer prompted Arciprete to end the first round after only two minutes. Arciprete feared that neither Sharky nor McClelland would be physically able to fight for the three planned three-minute rounds, so after the shortened first round, he, Haffner and Schneider agreed that the ensuing rounds would also last only two minutes each.

Between rounds, as Olschan paraded the round cards in front of the cameras, Arciprete and Haffner took live phonecalls from the viewing audience. These calls ranged from enthusiastic cheers for Sharky and McClelland, to regular viewer and caller “Ray From Bridgeport” complaining ”I'm missing ‘The Magic Of David Copperfield’ for THIS?!” (referring to the sloppy and amateurish boxing techniques of both Sharky and McClelland). Arciprete and Haffner tried putting their best spin on the poor performances of both boxers, but in one of the later rounds, even Haffner admitted ”This is amateur boxing at its worst” to which Arciprete laughingly agreed ”This is – at its worst”.

As the second and third rounds continued, Sharky (knowing that he had probably lost the first round) had given up the idea that McClelland was going to pull his punches, as Sharky had done in the first round. Sharky began attacking McClelland, but he found that he had to leap while throwing his punches to be able to connect with the head and face of his much-taller opponent. Again in Rounds Two and Three, problems with the protective headgear caused halts in the fight. In the third round, during one of the breaks in the action, Gus Montanaro (who was now in McClelland's corner) attempted to extend the break to give McClelland (who, like Sharky, was exhausted) more of a chance to rest. Sharky responded by walking halfway across the ring, pulling out his mouthpiece, and spitting on Montanaro (to the shock of the in-studio audience). Even Arciprete and Haffner, who knew of the bad blood between Sharky and Montanaro (from a behind-the-scenes battle between groups of Producers at WFAC-TV) were stunned at Sharky's gesture.

As the final bell rang and ”The Fight of the Century” ended, Sharky and McClelland embraced each other as Arciprete and Haffner explained to the viewing audience that both men were actually good friends. As Arciprete and Haffner tallied the final scores as determined by the three judges (members of the in-studio audience who understood the basic rules of boxing), they also continued to take phone calls, which at one point distracted them from their tallying of the scores. They decided that referee Dave Schneider could take over the program's hosting duties and conduct post-fight interviews with Sharky and McClelland while Arciprete and Haffner attempted to perform some simple math calculations. Sharky admitted to Schneider that he ”... got (his) ass kicked in the first round”, but would wait to see what the judges thought. McClelland somewhat-jokingly told Schneider that he thought that ”they're very fair judges” , referring to the fact that he was the only African-American in the studio – and that may have swayed the judges’ scores.

The final tally of the judges’ scores may have proven McClelland's suspicions correct, as Arciprete and Haffner announced that Sharky had won the fight by three points. Referee Dave Schneider said “I don't agree with this, but…” as he raised Sharky's hand and declared him the winner. One of the callers disputed the final results of the fight by asking ”How the HELL did Sharky win that?!” . Haffner tried to give a technical explanation that each of the three judges had taken one point off of McClelland's score (for the rabbit punches), thus resulting in a three-point victory for Sharky, while Arciprete's explanation was ”Well it's our show!”.

As the episode began running out of time, Arciprete and Haffner took a few final phonecalls from viewers as Gus Montanaro was seen on-camera being manhandled by The Bayou Mounty. Slurpee Boy Habbeeb also made an on-camera appearance at the request of one of the callers. Another caller said that they would like to see a re-match, but Haffner responded by saying ”It took us five months to get  this show together -– so, I don't think so”. Finally, Arciprete and Haffner thanked Sharky and McClelland, the in-studio and at-home audiences, as well as the crew of The Lone Shark for helping to make the episode a success.

In the aftermath of the episode, both Sharky and McClelland suffered severe pain and swelling in their hands for almost a week after the fight. Neither of them had wrapped their hands in tape before donning their boxing gloves, and they both regretted that decision. Later in the week, callers to other live programs at WFAC-TV expressed their enjoyment of the episode, praising Sharky and McClelland for actually fighting, and complimenting Arciprete and Haffner for their hosting of the episode. Even the WFAC-TV Station Manager (who had at first tried to stop the Fight of the Century episode from even happening) described this episode of The Lone Shark as ”… brilliant television”.

The Apology Dance (2000 – Live)

During a previous episode of The Lone Shark, host Jim Sharky had made some disparaging remarks about Bill Arciprete (the Producer/host of ”VoxPop Television”, ”Alternavision” and ”The Swindle”). Although Sharky and Arciprete are friends and Sharky's comments were made in jest, Arciprete informed Sharky that his (Arciprete's) mother happened to have watched The Lone Shark that week – and was not at all happy with Sharky. On the next week's episode of The Lone Shark, Sharky explained that each episode of the program was like a roller coaster and Producer Sean Haffner was the safety bar that kept Sharky from falling out of the roller coaster's car (in other words, Haffner was supposed to keep Sharky from going too far with his comments on the program). Sharky said that Haffner hadn't done his job during the previous episode. Sharky declared that he was dedicating that night's episode of The Lone Shark to Bill Arciprete's mother as a way of apologizing to her for his comments on the previous episode.

Sharky also wanted to have some way of showing Mrs. Arciprete how sorry he was for his comments (other than just dedicating the episode to her). His solution was to have The Lone Shark crew member Doug “Bret Magnum” Mandeville perform what Sharky called ”… an interpretive Apology Dance” for Mrs. Arciprete. Mandeville was known to The Lone Shark viewers as a crewmember who was willing to perform odd tasks on the program in order to get in front of the cameras (usually tasks that neither Sharky nor Haffner were willing to do, for fear of embarrassing themselves). Sharky, wanting to give the episode a Disco-era look, hosted the program in a suit jacket and dress shirt which was unbuttoned to his stomach, with the shirt's lapels pulled over his jacket's lapels. When Sharky was unable to find a thick gold necklace to wear across his exposed chest, Haffner grabbed a section of white coaxial cable and fashioned it into a makeshift (and odd-looking) “necklace” for Sharky to wear. Sharky had brought a disco ball to the studio, which Haffner then hung from the studio's ceiling lighting grid. Because the disco ball lacked a motor to make it spin, Haffner had to climb a ladder and manually spin the disco ball before each of the episode's dance segments.

When Mandeville entered the studio to begin his first “Apology Dance” segment, he was dressed in jeans, a T-shirt, workboots and Jim Sharky's deck hockey protective gear (a helmet, gloves, knee pads and elbow pads). Mandeville demanded that, if he was going to dance on live television, he would dance to his choice of music, which was music from the band 4 Non Blondes. As the music began, Mandeville began gyrating wildly under the scattered beams of light from the disco ball. In the control room, director Gordon Oppenheimer was rapidly switching back and forth between two cameras pointed at Mandeville, creating a video strobe effect. As Sharky and Haffner laughed uncontrollably at Mandeville's awkward dancing, Sharky shouted ”Crotch grab! Crotch grab!”, to which Mandeville responded by grabbing his crotch with the bulky deck hockey gloves, causing Sharky and Haffner to laugh even more. Sharky took viewer phone calls during the dance segment and as the song ended, one of the callers compared Mandeville to the mentally challenged character “Corky” from the television series “Life Goes On”. This prompted Sharky to refer to Mandeville as “Doug ’Corky’ Mandeville” for the rest of the episode.

After taking a few more viewer phone calls and discussing some of the day's news with Haffner, Sharky realized that the program would be ending shortly. He asked Haffner ”Are we ready for another dance, Sean?” to which Haffner enthusiastically responded ”I'm ready to spin that ball again, Jim!”. Sharky shouted ”Then spin that ball again, Sean! C’mon, Doug!” as the music began and Mandeville once again stepped in front of the cameras to continue dancing. During the second “Apology Dance” segment, Sharky challenged Haffner to join him in dancing with Mandeville, to which Haffner agreed. Sharky leapt off of the platform that his chair sat on and landed next to Mandeville, dancing along with him. Haffner ran out to join Sharky and Mandeville, but as soon as he got in front of the cameras, he realized that, with the episode coming to an end, he needed to keep in contact with Oppenheimer in the control room through his headset, so he immediately ran back to his camera. As the second “Apology Dance” segment ended and The Lone Shark's closing credits began to roll, Sharky and Haffner thanked Mandeville for performing “Apology Dance” segments, complimenting him for being the highlight of the episode. Sharky then asked Bill Arciprete's mother for her forgiveness, saying that he hoped that the episode had made up for his comments about her son. Later that week, Bill Arciprete informed Sharky that his mother had watched the “Apology Dance” episode of The Lone Shark and she had found it amusing.

VoxPop II (2000 – Live)

On the nights when host Jim Sharky was unable to be at the helm of The Lone Shark, Producer Sean Haffner had two options –- either host the program himself (which he didn't enjoy), or have the station broadcast a repeat episode. But on one such occasion, Sharky and Haffner decided to ask Bill Arciprete (aka "God" to his Stalkers) to host The Lone Shark. Haffner had co-hosted Alternavision and The Swindle with Arciprete during the same time period that he was co-hosting The Lone Shark with Sharky. Arciprete agreed to host The Lone Shark and when he arrived at the studio, he informed Haffner that Peter Vouras (Arciprete's former co-host on VoxPop Television) would be co-hosting the episode as well. Arciprete and Vouras had not been together on-camera since they stopped producing VoxPop Television in 1994. Vouras had moved to California and then New York City to pursue careers in stand-up comedy and acting (eventually landing a role in Spider-Man 2). Arciprete went on to produce Alternavision and The Swindle (which won the 1997 Billboard Video Music Award in the ”Best Regional Music Video Program” category).

This episode became a fusion of VoxPop Television and The Lone Shark. Haffner assumed his usual position behind the camera (and on microphone), while Arciprete and Vouras sat beside each other in front of the camera, just as when they had produced VoxPop Television. Arciprete assumed the role of the program's “straight man”, while Vouras (speaking with a faux Eastern-European accent) pretended to be “Yanosh” – a guest with years of experience in the European entertainment industry. Arciprete asked Vouras serious questions about Yanosh's work, and Vouras would respond with humorous answers. At one point in the episode, while fielding a phone call from an African-American Lone Shark viewer, Vouras (as Yanosh) suddenly changed his accent and told the caller ”Ya gotta back that thang up!”, which drew roars of laughter from the caller and her friends. As the episode progressed, Arciprete, Vouras and Haffner jokingly traded “inside” jibes at each other about sexual preferences, appearance and relationships (with Vouras and Haffner questioning whether each other had ever paid for sex). Eventually, Vouras completely abandoned the “Yanosh” character, while Arciprete and Haffner sarcastically commented on how Vouras had to turn away from the camera to “come out of character”.

For the rest of the episode, Arciprete and Vouras continued fielding phone calls from The Lone Shark viewers, many of whom were also long-time fans of VoxPop Television. The VoxPop Television fans expressed their delight at seeing Arciprete and Vouras once again together on television. Other callers who—before this episode of The Lone Shark – had never seen Arciprete and Vouras host a program together, complimented the pair on their performance on the evening's episode. The episode ended with Haffner thanking Arciprete and Vouras for reuniting for The Lone Shark.

The Semenex Taste Test (2001 – Live)

In the Summer of 2001, Jim Sharky had learned of a new product called “Semenex”. Semenex was a drink mix which changed the flavor of semen to make it more palatable to a man's sex partner. Never one to shy away from an opportunity to create an outrageous segment on The Lone Shark, Sharky decided to have a “Semenex Taste Test” on the program.

For this episode, Lone Shark crew member Doug “Bret Magnum” Mandeville would taste three “semen samples” supposedly provided by Jim Sharky, Jerry “Jer” McClelland and the SoundView Television Station Manager, after all three had supposedly ingested Semenex. The faux “semen samples” were actually vanilla, chocolate and strawberry milkshakes. The vanilla “sample” was said to have been provided by Sharky, the chocolate provided by McClelland (an African-American) and the strawberry provided by the Station Manager (the pink color of the milkshake and some comments by Sharky inferred that the Station Manager was possibly homosexual). Mandeville tasted the three “semen samples” and declared that Semenex did, indeed, make the “samples” taste better.

Because of recently rising tensions between the SoundView Television Station Manager and The Lone Shark's Producers, Sharky assumed that the Station Manager (or others on SoundView's management staff) would be closely watching each episode of the program and analyzing it to try to find a reason to take punitive actions against The Lone Shark. Sharky was correct, as he and Haffner were later told by one of the lower-level SoundView employees that the Station Manager was not at all amused by the “Semenex Taste Test” episode – or by Sharky's inferences as to the Station Manager's sexual preference.

The Morpheus Episode (2001 – Live)
[a.k.a. “Banned For Life”]

The final episode of The Lone Shark. As with many episodes of The Lone Shark, Jim Sharky had a list of topics to discuss with Sean Haffner, but not much else planned for the program – except for an installment of the semi-regular ”Jim Sharky's InterNOT” segment. ”Jim Sharky's InterNOT” was a segment on The Lone Shark which Sharky described as ”… featuring websites that Al Gore didn't have in mind when he ‘invented the Internet’”. The segment also featured new file sharing applications such as BearShare and LimeWire. Sharky would show Haffner and the viewers a pre-taped video of strange websites that he had found on the Internet. Haffner (on the monitor next to him) and the at-home viewers (on their televisions) would see a full-screen image of what had been on Sharky's computer when he recorded the video. Sharky and Haffner would then discuss the sites and the viewers would also call in to share their comments about the featured sites.

When a file sharing application was featured on The Lone Shark, Sharky would usually demonstrate the application's capabilities by running file searches for three subjects: a song by a popular artist or group, “The Simpsons” television series – and “hot anal” (a running joke from previous installments of the segment). When the multiple searches were started, Haffner (watching the video replay of the searches on a monitor next to his in-studio camera) would call out the progress of the concurrent searches as if he were an announcer at a horse race (”… and ‘Hot Anal’ is pulling ahead!”). In almost every installment of Jim Sharky's InterNOT, the “hot anal” search won the “race” by having the most files found available for downloading.

This particular episode of The Lone Shark included a segment of ”Jim Sharky's InterNOT” which featured the Morpheus file sharing application. One of the features that differentiated Morpheus from other file sharing applications (at that time) was the ability to play files as they were being downloaded. When the ”Jim Sharky's InterNOT” segment began, Haffner suddenly realized that the monitor on which he was supposed to watch the Morpheus video was out-of-focus and he could not adjust it to make the image clearer. Although this hindered Haffner's ability to do his usual “horse race” routine, Sharky urged Haffner to ”… stick with it”. The Morpheus video then showed the cursor on Sharky's monitor select one of the files downloading in the “hot anal” search. The cursor then moved across the screen to the Morpheus application's audio/visual controls and selected the “Play” button. After a momentary pause, a graphic adult video begins to play

A stunned Haffner could be heard calling ”KILL IT! KILL IT!” to the studio's control room. After three seconds of the adult video being broadcast to all of The Lone Shark's viewers, the control room switched back to the studio cameras. Host Jim Sharky began laughing as he said ”Thank God we put a warning in front of the show!” – referring to the “Objectionable Material” warning (accompanied by a submarine “dive” klaxon) that appeared at the beginning of every episode of The Lone Shark. Haffner groaned ”Ohhh my God… I'm gonna get a call about this tomorrow”. He then began imitating what he suspected would be the SoundView Television Station Manager's phone call that he would probably be receiving the following day: ”Uhh, Sean – I didn't see the show last night, but…” as Sharky put his head down to his desk, burying his face in his arms and laughing hysterically.

After he calmed himself down a bit, Sharky took a phone call from viewer and ”The Fight of the Century” referee Dave Schneider, who declared ”This is the best show… ever”, which caused Sharky to laugh some more as he half-heartedly attempted to claim that showing the adult video clip on live television was a mistake. The episode continued as if were any other episode of The Lone Shark, with Sharky and Haffner taking phonecalls while they talked with each other. The program ended uneventfully, with Sharky taking phonecalls to the end of the closing credits and Haffner's usual show-ending ”Good night!”. They would not know that The Lone Shark was suspended from production until a week later – and they would not learn that the suspension was permanent until over a month after ”The Morpheus Episode” of The Lone Shark was broadcast.

Lists of comedy television series episodes